The Myx Music Award for Song of the Year is one of the awards handed out at the yearly Myx Music Awards. It was first awarded in 2006 and presented to Cueshé for their song Stay. Gloc-9, Sarah Geronimo and SB19 are the only artists to win the award more than once.

Since the 2018, the name of the category has changed from Favorite Song to Song of the Year.

Recipients

Favorite Song (2006–2017)

Song of the Year (2018–present)

Category Facts

Most wins

Most nominations

References

External links
 Myx official site

Myx Music Awards
Philippine music awards
Song awards